The Antipodean was an annual Australian illustrated literary periodical first published in 1892.  It was edited by George Essex Evans in 1892, 1893 and 1897, with co-editors John Tighe Ryan (1892-3) and Banjo Paterson (1897).  The publisher was George Robertson & Co.

In its early years, the periodical published works such as:
 The Bush Undertaker (1892), by Henry Lawson
 The Geebung Polo Club (1893), by Banjo Paterson
 My Gulf Helmet, by George Essex Evans under the pseudonym "Christophus"
 A Daughter of Maoriland, by Henry Lawson

References

External links 
 The Antipodean, Trove, National Library of Australia
 Volume 3
 Reprint: In the '90s. When Stevenson Came to Sydney by W. Farmer Whyte
 PUBLICATIONS RECEIVED., Otago Daily Times, Issue 9929, 23 December 1893, Page 4
 LOCAL AND GENERAL., Evening Post, Volume LIV, Issue 114, 10 November 1897, Page 4
 The Antipodean, The Queenslander, 17 December 1892

1892 establishments in Australia
Annual magazines published in Australia
Defunct literary magazines published in Australia
Magazines established in 1892
Magazines with year of disestablishment missing
Magazines published in Melbourne